The Ministry of High-Tech Industry  is a ministry of the Armenian government, headquartered in Yerevan. The Ministry of High-Tech Industry is a central body of executive authority that develops and implements the Armenian Government’s policy in the spheres of communication, information, information technology and information security, postal services, licensing, granting of permits and military industry. The current Minister of High-Tech Industry is Robert Khachatryan.

See also

 Economy of Armenia
 Telecommunications in Armenia

References

External links
 Ministry of High-Tech Industry official website
 Ministry of High-Tech Industry on Facebook

Government ministries of Armenia